This is a list of the butterflies of family Hesperiidae  which are found in Sri Lanka. It is part of List of the butterflies of Sri Lanka.

Species

References
Henry, G. M. R. and Woodhouse, L. G. O. (1942) The Butterfly Fauna of Ceylon. Colombo; Ceylon. 153pp.
Moore, F. C. (1880–87) The Lepidoptera of Ceylon. L. Reeve & Co.: London. 3 v.
Ormiston, W. (1924) The Butterflies of Ceylon Colombo, H. W. Cave
Talbot, G. 1947 The Fauna of British India, Ceylon and Burma: Butterflies (Vol 1 & 2)

Lists of butterflies of Sri Lanka
Hesperiidae by location